Fernando Poe Jr. Avenue (also referred to as FPJ Avenue and still commonly referred to by its former name Roosevelt Avenue) is the principal north–south tertiary road serving the San Francisco del Monte district (colloquially known as Frisco) of Quezon City, Philippines. The avenue is named after Fernando Poe Jr., a renowned actor and National Artist of the Philippines. As Roosevelt Avenue, it was named after United States president Franklin D. Roosevelt.

The avenue and the adjacent area are also referred to by local residents as Muñoz, being the site of a popular wet market, the Muñoz Market, located at the corner of FPJ Avenue and EDSA. The market was named after its owner Demetrio Muñoz, a philanthropist, businessman and a presidential adviser during the term of Diosdado Macapagal from the province of Pampanga. At the opposite end of FPJ on Quezon Avenue is Fisher Mall, a commercial establishment built on the land that used to be the main terminal of the Pangasinan Transportation Company (PANTRANCO) that went bankrupt in 1993. FPJ Avenue is also home to the former transmitter of Intercontinental Broadcasting Corporation (IBC).

Renaming proposals 
In 2010, a bill was authored in Congress by Quezon City's 1st district representative Vincent Crisologo renaming Roosevelt Avenue after his predecessor, former representative Reynaldo Calalay.

Senate amended House Bill No. 7499, originally to rename the adjacent Del Monte Avenue after the actor Fernando Poe Jr. After considerations from opinions from various religious groups and the National Historical Commission of the Philippines, Senate President Tito Sotto introduced amendment to rename Roosevelt Avenue instead. On September 13, 2021, the Senate approved the amendment and the bill. The House concurred with Senate amendment on September 28 and was transmitted to President Rodrigo Duterte on November 20 for his signature. On December 10, 2021, President Duterte signed Republic Act No. 11608, renaming the road as Fernando Poe Jr. Avenue. It was published at the Official Gazette on January 13, 2022.

Route description

FPJ Avenue is located in Quezon City, northeast of Manila and runs for roughly  along a north–south axis. Starting at its southern terminus at the junction with Quezon Avenue in Barangay Santa Cruz, the road heads north toward Barangay Paraiso providing access to Damayan, site of the old Santuario de San Pedro Bautista church of the former pueblo of San Francisco del Monte built in 1593. It intersects with Del Monte Avenue from where it continues on a straight path north through the mixed residential and industrial villages of San Antonio and Paltok where a Coca-Cola plant stands next to the IBC transmitter. The road ends at the intersection with EDSA by the Muñoz Market and Walter Mart North Edsa.

North of EDSA, FPJ continues as Congressional Avenue heading northeast to Project 8 and Culiat area. It is served by Roosevelt station of LRT Line 1.

External links
 Amendment to HB 7499, Senate of the Philippines, Third Reading copy

References

Streets in Metro Manila